George Florance Irby, 6th Baron Boston (6 September 1860 – 16 September 1941) was a British scientist and Conservative politician.

Boston was the eldest son of Florance George Henry Irby, 5th Baron Boston, and his wife Augusta Caroline (née Saumarez), and was educated at Eton and Christ Church, Oxford. He succeeded his father in the barony in 1877 at the age of sixteen and later took his seat on the Conservative benches in the House of Lords. Between 1885 and 1886 he served as a Lord-in-waiting (government whip in the House of Lords) in the short-lived Conservative administration of Lord Salisbury. Boston was also deeply interested in astronomy, botany, entomology and archaeology and was a Fellow of the Society of Antiquaries and of the Geological Society. In 1936 he was awarded an Honorary Doctorate of Law (LL.D.) by the University of Wales, Bangor for his services to culture. He also served as a deputy lieutenant of Anglesey.

Lord Boston married his first cousin once removed Cecilia Constance, daughter of Augustus Anthony Frederick Irby, in 1890. The marriage was childless. She died in January 1938, aged 67. Lord Boston survived her by three years and died in September 1941, aged 81. He was succeeded in the barony by his nephew Greville.

References

1860 births
1941 deaths
People educated at Eton College
Alumni of Christ Church, Oxford
6
Fellows of the Society of Antiquaries of London
Fellows of the Geological Society of London